The Honda CB250 G5 is a motorcycle that was produced and sold mainly in Europe between 1974 and 1976. Produced with and very closely related to the CB360, the CB250 G5 was also a parallel-twin, four-stroke motorcycle.

The CB250 G5 had a six-speed gearbox.

Honda billed the CB250 G5 in the original owners manual as "one of the finest sport-touring motorcycles available".

CB250 G5
Motorcycles powered by straight-twin engines
Motorcycles introduced in 1974